Dieffenbachia longispatha is a species of flowering plant in the family Araceae, native to Panama and Colombia. A large member of its genus, reaching , it is pollinated by scarab beetles from the genera Cyclocephala and Erioscelis.

References

longispatha
Flora of Panama
Flora of Colombia
Plants described in 1915